Voznesensky (masculine), Voznesenskaya (feminine), or Voznesenskoye (neuter) may refer to:

People 
Alexander Voznesensky (1898–1950), Soviet economist
Anastasiya Voznesenskaya, Soviet actress, wife of Andrey Myagkov
Andrei Voznesensky (1933–2010), Russian poet and writer
Igor Voznesensky (born 1985), Russian soccer player
Ilya G. Voznesensky (1816–1871), Russian explorer and naturalist
Julia Voznesenskaya (1940–2015), author of books with Orthodox Christian view
Nikolai Voznesensky (1903–1950), Soviet economic planner
Philaret (Voznesensky) (1903–1985), first hierarch of the Russian Orthodox Church Outside Russia

Places 
Voznesensky District, a district of Nizhny Novgorod Oblast, Russia
Voznesenskoye Urban Settlement, several municipal urban settlements in Russia
Voznesensky (inhabited locality) (Voznesenskaya, Voznesenskoye), several inhabited localities in Russia
Voznesensky Avenue, a street in St. Petersburg, Russia
Voznesensky Lane, a street in Moscow, Russia

Other 
Ascension Cathedral (disambiguation), one of several cathedrals known also as Voznesensky Cathedral
Ascension Convent, also known as Voznesensky Convent, a dismantled female cloister in the Moscow Kremlin, Moscow, Russia